Vroom in the night sky is an action game developed and published by Poisoft and released on March 3, 2017, in Europe and Japan, and on April 5, 2017, in North America for the Nintendo Switch.

It received universally negative reviews from critics, becoming one of the worst reviewed games for the platform and considered a "rushed launch title".

Gameplay 
The player is a magical girl who rides on a flying scooter and collects items called "Stardusts", while shooting missiles at giant circles in order to open a portal. The player can also earn Stardusts for doing "cool moves", which can be spent on new bikes.

Plot 
The player is named "Magical Girl Luna" and is attempting to open a portal known as the "Magical Gate". Other characters in the game include a flying creature and an evil witch.

Reception 
The game received an overwhelmingly negative reception, with an aggregate score of 17/100 on Metacritic, one of the lowest scores of the site.

Criticism targeted its controls, story and translation. Jed Whitaker of Destructoid rated the game 1/10, calling it a "steaming pile of shit", saying it was not only one of the worst games on the Switch, but one of the worst he had ever reviewed in his life. He called the controls "slippery" and "imprecise", and the story nonsensical due to its poor translation. He stated that he could not imagine "how or why" Nintendo would have approved the game for sale, calling it "shovelware". Glen Fox of Pocket Gamer said that it was better to "go outside and read a book" than even attempt to play the game, calling it "truly awful" and the price "insulting". Casey Gibson of Nintendo World Report said that the game was "the epitome of a rushed launch title" and that "every Switch owner should pass on [it]".

References 

2017 video games
Action video games
Nintendo Switch-only games
Nintendo Switch games
Video games developed in Japan
Video games featuring female protagonists
Single-player video games
Magical girl video games